Torralba de Ribota is a municipality located in the province of Zaragoza, Aragon, Spain. According to the 2004 census (INE), the municipality had a population of 189 inhabitants.

References

External links

 Municipal Official Website

Municipalities in the Province of Zaragoza